is an amateur Japanese Greco-Roman wrestler, who competed in the men's featherweight category. He won two gold medals in his division at the 2009 Asian Wrestling Championships in Pattaya, Thailand, and at the 2010 Asian Games in Guangzhou, China, defeating India's Jogender Singh and pinning Kyrgyzstan's Kanybek Zholchubekov, respectively. Hasegawa is also a member of the wrestling team for Fukuichi Gyogyo Co. Ltd., and is coached and trained by Hiroshi Ohta.

Hasegawa represented Japan at the 2012 Summer Olympics in London, where he competed in the men's 55 kg class. He defeated Belarus' Elbek Tazhyieu in the preliminary round of sixteen, before losing out the quarterfinal match to Danish wrestler and two-time Olympian Håkan Nyblom, who was able to score four points in two straight periods, leaving Hasegawa without a single point.

References

External links
Profile – International Wrestling Database
NBC Olympics Profile

1984 births
Living people
Olympic wrestlers of Japan
Wrestlers at the 2012 Summer Olympics
Wrestlers at the 2010 Asian Games
Asian Games medalists in wrestling
Sportspeople from Shizuoka Prefecture
Wrestlers at the 2014 Asian Games
Japanese male sport wrestlers
Asian Games gold medalists for Japan
Medalists at the 2010 Asian Games
Medalists at the 2014 Asian Games
Asian Wrestling Championships medalists
21st-century Japanese people